MHR may refer to:

 the ISO 639 code for Meadow Mari language
 Matheran Hill Railway
 Mid Hants Railway
 Member of the Human Race (M.H.R.), an ironic expression
 Member of the Australian House of Representatives
 Member of the New Zealand House of Representatives, used between the 1860s and 1907
 Montpellier Hérault Rugby, a prominent French rugby union club
 Muswell Hill Railway
 Sacramento Mather Airport
 Mediterranean Historical Review, academic journal
 MHR (formerly MidlandHR), a UK business
 Mike Harmon Racing
 MHR Development, LLC
 Monster Hunter Rise